Wali is an Arabic word meaning guardian, custodian, protector, or helper. In English, it most often means a Muslim saint or holy person. It has sometimes been extended to mean the tomb or shrine of such a man.

Wali or WALI may also refer to:
Wali (Islamic legal guardian)
Al-Walī (Arabic:) and Al-Wālī (Arabic:), are two related names of God in Islam
Wāli, an administrative title used by the Arabic and Ottoman Caliphates
Wali language (Sudan), a Nubian language
Wali language (Ghana), a Gur language
Wali (band), an Indonesian band
Wali, Mauritania, an alternate spelling of Waly Diantang,  a village in the Gorgol Region
WALI, a radio station (1280 AM) licensed to serve Dayton, Tennessee, United States
WOEZ (FM), a radio station (93.7 FM) licensed to serve Burton, South Carolina, United States, which used the call sign WALI from 1996 to 2017
Wali (game), two-player abstract strategy game

People 
Wali Muhammad Wali
Wali (sniper), Canadian sniper
Wali (given name)
Wali (surname)

See also 
Vali (disambiguation)